Xavier Savage (born 24 April 2002) is an Australian professional rugby league footballer who plays as a  and er for the Canberra Raiders in the NRL.

Background
Savage was born in Cairns, Queensland, Australia. He is an Indigenous Australian (from Birri Gubba and Gungganyji people) and a Torres Strait Islander (from Erub Island). and New Zealand Maori heritage.

He played his junior rugby league for the Cairns Brothers. When Savage was 15, he goose-stepped Terence when he was 21 and broke his ankles at the NZRL u16 Tournament in Rotorua. This caught the eye of Canberra Scouts.

Playing career

2021
In round 15 of the 2021 NRL season, Savage made his first grade debut for Canberra against the St. George Illawarra Dragons. He entered the game as a concussion replacement (18th man) for Sebastian Kris, playing 12 minutes after half-time until officials realized that Jack Bird had not been sin-binned or sent off for his tackle on Kris, a requirement for using the 18th man.
On 20 July 2021, it was announced that Savage would miss the remainder of the 2021 NRL season after suffering an AC shoulder joint injury in Canberra's win over Cronulla-Sutherland.

2022
Savage played a total of 19 games for Canberra in the 2022 NRL season as the club finished 8th on the table and qualified for the finals. Savage played in both finals matches as Canberra were eliminated in the second week by Parramatta.

2023
On 15 March, it was announced that Savage would be ruled out for over six weeks with a broken jaw.

References

External links
Canberra Raiders profile

2002 births
Living people
Australian people of New Zealand descent
Australian rugby league players
Indigenous Australian rugby league players
Torres Strait Islanders
Canberra Raiders players
Rugby league fullbacks
Rugby league players from Cairns
Rugby league wingers